The Rozelle Interchange is an under-construction underground motorway interchange in Sydney, Australia. It is being built as part of WestConnex and is expected to open in late 2023. The interchange also includes a toll-free bypass of the Victoria Road between the Iron Cove Bridge and the Anzac Bridge known as the Iron Cove Link.

The interchange is located at the site of the former Rozelle Rail Yards.

The interchange will also be the southern terminus of the proposed Western Harbour Tunnel. Stub tunnels for the new tunnel have been built during the construction of the interchange.

On the surface above the underground interchange is an under-construction parkland known as Rozelle Parklands.

Design
The interchange consists of two parallel sets of main tunnels originating from the M4 (west-facing only) and the M8 (east-facing only) sections of the M4–M8 Link respectively, as well as the Iron Cove Link tunnels.

The tunnels originating from the M4 mainly leads into the Western Distributor and the Anzac Bridge, with entry and exit ramps connecting to the future Western Harbour Tunnel. There is no connection between Victoria Road (Iron Cove Bridge) and the M4 tunnels via the Iron Cove Link. Until the Western Harbour Tunnel opens, all traffic from the M4 tunnels will lead to the Western Distributor and Anzac Bridge only, as there are no other entrance or exits.

The tunnels originating from the M8 mainly leads into the future Western Harbour Tunnel, with entry and exit ramps connecting to the Iron Cove Link (towards Iron Cove Bridge) and City West Link. Traffic from the M8 will utilise the City West Link exit to access the Western Distributor and the Anzac Bridge via City West Link, and vice versa.

The Iron Cove Link tunnels connect between the Western Distributor/Anzac Bridge and Victoria Road at Iron Cove Bridge. The Iron Cove Link will be toll-free.

Future entrance and exit portals to the Western Harbour Tunnel have also been built at the intersection of City West Link and The Crescent, and will create a four-way interchange when they open.

Construction
The main contractor for the construction of the interchange and Iron Cove Link a joint venture between John Holland and CPB Contractors. Unlike the other stages of WestConnex, construction is directly managed by Transport for NSW rather than WestConnex.

Construction began in 2020, with the halfway mark achieved in April 2021.

Operation
The Rozelle West motorway operations complex will be located on the western end of the Rozelle Parklands, and it will comprise the majority of the operations facilities for the Rozelle Interchange, including maintenance and operations, substation, fire water pumps and deluge tanks, water treatment plants etc.

Rozelle Parklands
Above the tunnels at the location of the former rail yards, open green space of up to  known as the Rozelle Parklands is being constructed. The parkland will have a wetlands, a village green, playing and barbecue facilities, and active transport links. A shared user path bridge over City West Link will also connect the parkland to the Rozelle Bay light rail stop and the southern side of The Crescent.

The Rozelle Parklands was proposed as part of the urban design and landscape plan for the Rozelle Interchange project. The plan was released for community consultation in August and September 2020. During the community consultation, more than 1600 individual comments and 723 official submissions of feedback were received. In response, Transport for NSW established the Rozelle Parklands Working Group (RPWG) which included local community member and representatives from the Department of Planning, Industry and Environment (DPIE), Office of Sport, Inner West Council and Transport for NSW. The RPWG was responsible for managing the consultation and making recommendations to Transport for NSW. In May 2021, their final recommendations report was presented to the Minister for Transport and Roads, and the urban design and landscape plan was approved by the DPIE.

References

Road interchanges in Australia
Transport infrastructure completed in 2023
2023 establishments in Australia